Sergei Ageyev (born June 5, 1984) is a Russian ice hockey goaltender. He is currently playing with HC Astana of the Russian Higher Hockey League.

During the 2011-12 season, he played three playoff games with HC Izhstal of the Kazakhstan Hockey Championship, the top level of ice hockey in Kazakhstan.

References

External links 

1984 births
Living people
HC Izhstal players
Russian ice hockey goaltenders
Sportspeople from Penza